S. A. M. Hussain was an Indian politician belonging to  Dravida Munnetra Kazhagam. He was elected as a member of Tamil Nadu Legislative Assembly from Triplicane in 2001. He died on 6 August 2019 at the age of 80.

References

1930s births
2019 deaths
Dravida Munnetra Kazhagam politicians
Members of the Tamil Nadu Legislative Assembly